Jahia is a software company offering enterprise products, services, and technical support for its open-source digital experience platform. Jahia’s platform provides content and customer data management. The company’s head optional content management system and digital experience platform is designed to support various digital enterprise initiatives, such as websites, progressive web applications, mobile apps, intranets and portals.

Products 

Products

 jContent – A hybrid content management system (CMS)
 jExperience – A digital experience (DX) solution combining customer data with content management for personalized customer experiences
 jCustomer – An open source Customer Data Platform (CDP) built with Apache Unomi

Architecture

 Java based
 API-first platform
 Head optional / hybrid CMS
 Cloud or on premises

History 

 2002: The company was founded in Geneva, Switzerland. As of 2020, it has offices in Switzerland, the United States, France and Canada.
 2015: Jahia completed a $22.5 million round of financing from Invus
 2018: Jahia donated its open source CDP to The Apache Software Foundation.
 2019: Graduation of Apache Unomi as a Top-Level Project (TLP) of The Apache Software Foundation (ASF).

References

External links 
 

Portal software